Champoeg Creek is a tributary, roughly  long, of the Willamette River in the U.S. state of Oregon. The creek is formed by the confluence of its two forks in the French Prairie region of the Willamette Valley and flows generally northeast to meet the Willamette  from the river's confluence with the Columbia River. Its course lies entirely in Marion County.

The name "Champoeg" comes from the Kalapuyan word [čʰámpuik], which might be an abbreviation of [čʰa-čʰíma-púičuk], referring to the edible root [púičuk], or yampa.

Course
The creek begins at the confluence of East Fork Champoeg Creek and West Fork Champoeg Creek in French Prairie and flows generally northeast. Not far from its source, Champoeg Creek enters McKay Reservoir then Spada Reservoir, where it passes under St. Paul Highway Northeast. Shortly thereafter, it receives Murphy Creek from the left. It passes under McKay Road Northeast and Champoeg Road Northeast before receiving Case Creek from the right and Mission Creek from the left in Champoeg State Heritage Area. Less than  later, it enters the Willamette River  from the larger stream's mouth on the Columbia River.

See also
List of rivers of Oregon

References

Rivers of Oregon
Rivers of Marion County, Oregon
Oregon placenames of Native American origin